Sears, Roebuck and Co., commonly known as Sears, is an American chain of department stores.

Sears may refer to:

Related and unrelated businesses
 Sears (Mexico), a chain of department stores in Mexico
 Sears Canada, a chain of department stores in Canada
 Sears Holdings, former parent of Sears and other companies
 Sears plc, a former British holdings company
 Sears Seating, also known as Sears Manufacturing, an American designer and manufacturer

Buildings
 Sears Building, the name of several buildings
 Sears, Roebuck and Company Complex, in Chicago, Illinois, U.S.
 Sears Tower, the former name of the Willis Tower, in Chicago, Illinois, U.S.

People
 Eleonora Sears (1881–1968), American national tennis champion
 Ernest Robert Sears (1910–1991), American plant geneticist
 Francis Sears (1898–1975), American physicist
 Fred F. Sears (1913–1957), American film actor and director
 Freddie Sears (b. 1989), English professional footballer
 James T. Sears, American historian
 JP Sears, a life coach and internet comedian
 JP Sears (baseball) (born 1996), American baseball player
 Leslie Sears (1901–1992), English cricketer
 Mary Sears (disambiguation), more than one person
 Minnie Earl Sears (1873–1933), American librarian, cataloguer, and bibliographer who formulated the Sears Subject Headings
 Richard Sears (disambiguation), more than one person, including:
 Richard Warren Sears (1863–1914), American manager, businessman, and co-founder of Sears, Roebuck and Company
 Robert Sears (disambiguation)
 Simon Sears (b. 1984), Danish actor
 Teddy Sears (b. 1977), American actor
 Varley F. Sears (1937–2019), Canadian physicist
 William Sears (disambiguation), more than one person
 Winsome Sears (b. 1964), American politician and Lieutenant Governor of Virginia

Other uses
 Scotland's Environmental and Rural Services (SEARS), a partnership of environmental agencies
 , a United States Navy oceanographic survey ship in commission since 2001

See also
 Sear (disambiguation)
 Seares (disambiguation)
 Transform Holdco, the parent of Sears and other companies